Kell am See is a municipality in the Trier-Saarburg district, in Rhineland-Palatinate, Germany. It is situated in the Hunsrück, approx. 20 km southeast of Trier.

Kell am See was the seat of the former Kell am See Verbandsgemeinde ("collective municipality").

Until 2013, there was a yearly festival in Kell which is called Highway To Kell.

References

External links
  
 www.highway-to-kell.de

Trier-Saarburg